Haplochromis teegelaari is a species of cichlid endemic to Lake Victoria though it may now be extinct.  This species reaches a length of  SL. Its specific name honours the Dutch biological artist Nico Teegelaar.

References

teegelaari
Fish described in 1978
Taxonomy articles created by Polbot